Meelva may refer to several places in Estonia:

Meelva, Lääne County, village in Lihula Parish, Lääne County
Meelva, Põlva County, village in Räpina Parish, Põlva County
Lake Meelva, lake in Räpina Parish